The 2012 Golden Spin of Zagreb was the 45th edition of the annual senior-level international figure skating competition held in Zagreb, Croatia. It was held at the Dom sportova on December 13–16, 2012. Medals were awarded in the disciplines of men's singles, ladies' singles, pair skating, and ice dancing.

Medalists

Results

Men

Ladies

Pairs

Ice dancing

External links
 Results
 Official website

Golden Spin of Zagreb
Golden Spin Of Zagreb, 2012
Golden Spin Of Zagreb, 2012